5 Cs may refer to:

 Five Cs of Singapore, meaning "Cash, Car, Credit card, Condominium and Country club membership", a phrase used in Singapore to refer to materialism
 The 5Cs, the foundation of the early economy of Phoenix, Arizona.